Parcko Geovanni Quiroz Figueroa (born 21 April 1968) is a Chilean former football player who played as a defender for clubs in Chile and Peru.

Club career
Born in Papudo, Chile, Quiroz was with Universidad Católica before joining the Colo-Colo youth system. He took part of the first team since 1984. In December 1987, he was loaned to Alianza Lima for the 1988 season, on a deal for three months, after the tragic plane crash that suffered the Peruvian squad, alongside his fellows José Letelier, Francisco Huerta and René Pinto. He and his fellows made their debut against Coronel Bolognesi on 3 January 1988.

After stints with Naval de Talcahuano (1988), and Cobreandino (1989), he returned to Peru and played for Alianza Lima, José Gálvez, Ovación Sipesa, later Deportivo Sipesa, and Cienciano.

In 1996, he played for Deportes Arica in the Primera B de Chile.

After football
Following his retirement, Quiroz stayed in Peru and developed a coaching career in clubs based in provinces, such as El Tumi from Tarapoto. He returned to his city of birth in 2010 and has went on playing football at amateur level in clubs such as Unión Lo Franco as wells as serving as coach at sports workshops for the Municipality of Papudo.

Honours
 Torneo Zonal:

References

External links
 
 
 Parcko Quiroz at playmakerstats.com (English version of ceroacero.es)

1968 births
Living people
People from Petorca Province
Chilean footballers
Chilean expatriate footballers
Colo-Colo footballers
Club Alianza Lima footballers
Naval de Talcahuano footballers
Trasandino footballers
Deportivo Sipesa footballers
José Gálvez FBC footballers
Cienciano footballers
San Marcos de Arica footballers
Chilean Primera División players
Primera B de Chile players
Peruvian Primera División players
Chilean expatriate sportspeople in Peru
Expatriate footballers in Peru
Association football defenders
Chilean football managers
Chilean expatriate football managers
Expatriate football managers in Peru